In statistics, the closed testing procedure is a general method for performing more than one hypothesis test simultaneously.

The closed testing principle
Suppose there are k hypotheses H1,..., Hk to be tested and the overall type I error rate is α.  The closed testing principle allows the rejection of any one of these elementary hypotheses, say Hi, if all possible intersection hypotheses involving Hi can be rejected by using valid local level α tests; the adjusted p-value is the largest among those hypotheses. It controls the family-wise error rate for all the k hypotheses at level α in the strong sense.

Example
Suppose there are three hypotheses H1,H2, and H3 to be tested and the overall type I error rate is 0.05. Then H1 can be rejected at level α if H1 ∩ H2 ∩ H3,  H1 ∩ H2,  H1 ∩ H3 and  H1 can all be rejected using valid tests with level α.

Special cases
The Holm–Bonferroni method is a special case of a closed test procedure for which each intersection null hypothesis is tested using the simple Bonferroni test.  As such, it controls the family-wise error rate for all the k hypotheses at level α in the strong sense.

Multiple test procedures developed using the graphical approach for constructing and illustrating multiple test procedures are a subclass of closed testing procedures.

See also
 Multiple comparisons
 Holm–Bonferroni method
 Bonferroni correction

References

Statistical hypothesis testing
Statistical tests
Multiple comparisons